The Eyes of Horror is an EP by American death metal band Possessed. It was released on May 31, 1987. It was produced by guitarist Joe Satriani.

Track listing

Personnel
Jeff Becerra - bass, vocals
Larry Lalonde - lead guitar
Mike Torrao - rhythm guitar
Mike Sus - drums

Production
Joe Satriani – producer
John Cuniberti, Tom Size – engineers
Steve Sinclair – executive producer

Cover versions
Amon Amarth – "The Eyes of Horror" on their 2001 album The Crusher
 Cannibal Corpse – "Confessions" on their 2003 EP Worm Infested
Sinister – "Storm in My Mind" on their 2001 album Creative Killings

References

Possessed (band) albums
1987 EPs
Combat Records albums